Spotted oak is a common name for several species of oaks and may refer to:

Quercus buckleyi
Quercus nigra, native to the eastern and south-central United States
Quercus shumardii
Quercus velutina, native to eastern and central North America